Suomalainen is a Finnish word, meaning "Finn." It may refer to:

 Suomalainen (surname)
 Suomalainen (newspaper), a short-lived weekly published by the Socialist Party of America
 Suomalainen Kirjakauppa, a bookstore chain